Puthiya Parasakthi is a 1996 Indian Tamil-language film, directed by Gowri Rajan and produced by G. Agastin. The film stars Selva, Sukanya and Napoleon. The film was a remake of Telugu film Yerra Mandaram.

Cast
Selva as Chinnasamy
Sukanya as Parasakthi
Napoleon as Rajadurai

Soundtrack
The music was composed by Deva. Lyrics were written by Vairamuthu, Kalidasan, Piraisoodan, Kanimozhi and Chidambaranathan.

References

1996 films
1990s Tamil-language films
Films with screenplays by M. Karunanidhi
Tamil remakes of Telugu films